Proti tis Aigialeias (or -Egialias) is the most famous weekly newspaper that is based in Aigio in the Achaea prefecture in Greece and it serves the Aigaleia area.  It was founded in 1994 as a weekly paper and it became daily in 1999.  In the Saturday edition, it has a passo section with local stuff with several characteristics.

References
The first version of the article is translated and is based from the article at the Greek Wikipedia (el:Main Page)

See also
List of newspapers in Greece

1994 establishments in Greece
Aigialeia
Mass media in Aigio
Greek-language newspapers
Publications established in 1994
Defunct weekly newspapers

el:Πρώτη της Αιγιαλείας